Germano Barale (born 23 January 1936) is an Italian racing cyclist. He rode in the 1962 Tour de France.

References

External links
 

1936 births
Living people
Italian male cyclists
Place of birth missing (living people)
Cyclists from Piedmont
Sportspeople from the Province of Verbano-Cusio-Ossola